Mohamed Seydou Dera (born 9 April 1986) is a Côte d'Ivoire footballer, who plays for Rail Club du Kadiogo.

Career 
Sera started his career with AS Cocody and was 2006 promoted to the seniorside of the club, who played this time in the Division 3. In the following season signed in February 2007 for Tunesian side US Monastir. In Winter 2007 signed for Belarusian side FC Savit Mogilev and a half year later with Lokomotiv Minsk. He played 8 games and scored four goals in the second half of the 2008 Belarusian Season and moved in January 2009 to Neman Grodno. In August 2010 signed in Burkina Faso for Rail Club du Kadiogo.

International 
He was member for Côte d'Ivoire under-20 national team, before earned the first call-up for the Burkina Faso national football team 2010.

References

1986 births
Living people
Ivorian footballers
FC Neman Grodno players
Ivorian expatriate sportspeople in Belarus
FC Savit Mogilev players
Ivorian expatriate footballers
US Monastir (football) players
Burkinabé expatriate footballers
Burkinabé footballers
Association football midfielders
Burkinabé people of Ivorian descent
Expatriate footballers in Belarus
FC SKVICH Minsk players
21st-century Burkinabé people